Primus is an American rock band formed in El Sobrante, California in 1984. The band is currently composed of bassist/vocalist Les Claypool, guitarist Larry "Ler" LaLonde, and drummer Tim "Herb" Alexander. Primus originally formed in 1984 with Claypool and guitarist Todd Huth, later joined by drummer Jay Lane, though the latter two departed the band at the beginning of 1989, and were replaced by LaLonde and Alexander respectively.

The "classic" lineup of Claypool, LaLonde and Alexander debuted with the live album Suck on This, which was self-released in 1989 on Claypool's label Prawn Song and reissued a year later by Caroline Records. Caroline also released Primus' debut studio album Frizzle Fry (1990), which was critically well received and its underground success led to interest from major record labels. Their second studio album and major-label debut Sailing the Seas of Cheese (1991), released through Interscope Records, launched the band into mainstream exposure, supported by their first charting single "Jerry Was a Race Car Driver" and receiving platinum certification within a decade after its release. Primus repeated its success with their next two albums, Pork Soda (1993) and Tales from the Punchbowl (1995), both charting in the top ten on the Billboard 200, and being certified platinum and gold respectively by the RIAA; the former album featured the band's top ten hit on the Billboard rock chart, "My Name Is Mud", while the latter's lead single "Wynona's Big Brown Beaver" has the distinction of being their only song to chart anywhere outside of North America.

Alexander left the band in 1996, and was replaced by Bryan "Brain" Mantia, with whom Primus recorded two more studio albums – Brown Album (1997) and Antipop (1999) – as well as the covers EP Rhinoplasty (1998) and the original theme song for the TV show South Park. The band went on hiatus in 2000 but resumed activity in 2003, reuniting with Alexander for the EP/DVD Animals Should Not Try to Act Like People and touring sporadically throughout the 2000s before Alexander once again left in 2010. Lane rejoined the band and appeared on their seventh studio album – and first in twelve years – Green Naugahyde (2011). Following Lane's departure in 2013, Alexander returned to the band once again and Primus has since recorded two more albums with him – Primus & the Chocolate Factory with the Fungi Ensemble (2014) and The Desaturating Seven (2017) – as well as the EP Conspiranoid (2022).

Primus is characterized by its irreverent, quirky approach to music distinguished by Claypool's bass-first songwriting style and eccentric lyrical themes. In 1993, Robert Christgau remarked: "[Primus is] quite possibly the strangest top-10 band ever, and good for them."

Band history

The early years and Frizzle Fry (1984–1990)
Primus began in El Sobrante, California, in 1984 under the name Primate with singer and bassist Les Claypool, guitarist Todd Huth, and a LinnDrum drum machine. The duo initially had trouble finding a drummer, until Claypool's friend Vince "Perm" Parker returned home from a stint in the army, and together the three of them recorded their first demo, financed by Claypool selling his car. Primate changed their name to Primus after "about a month" when they were approached by a group called the Primates threatening legal action over the similarity of their names. Parker was soon replaced by the band's second drummer, Peter Libby, who played on their first demo as Primus. After 2–3 years with the band he was himself replaced by Robbie Bean,  Tim "Curveball" Wright had the drum chair for 6 months in 1988. After rising to fame in the local music scene with their brand of funk metal fusion, reaching the point where they were "selling out Berkeley Square", Wright was fired from Primus in the summer of 1988 to be replaced by Jay Lane, drummer with the Freaky Executives, who were "getting dicked around by their record company", as Claypool later described it.

At the end of 1988, after recording another demo, titled Sausage, Lane left Primus when "something good happened" with the Freaky Executives' record deal. Huth also soon left the band, expressing a desire to dedicate more time to his family. In 1987, Primus was put on hold briefly and Claypool rejoined his former band, Blind Illusion, who at the time also featured one-time Joe Satriani student and ex-Possessed guitarist Larry "Ler" LaLonde. Claypool recruited LaLonde to reform Primus together with Tim "Herb" Alexander, drummer with the Arizona-based group Major Lingo, and a month later, the trio recorded their first album: Suck on This (1989), a live recording culled from two of their Berkeley concerts, funded by a loan from Claypool's father. Brain (who later joined the band in 1996) was briefly a member of the band during this time period, before a broken foot forced him to leave the group.

In 1990, the band released their first studio album, Frizzle Fry, and released singles for "John the Fisherman" and "Too Many Puppies". With a music video featuring Kirk Hammett, a studio album and a tour with Jane's Addiction, Primus' popularity grew to the point where they attracted attention from Interscope Records, who signed them in 1990.

Seas of Cheese, Pork Soda, and Tales from the Punchbowl (1991–1996)
Primus's major label debut was the album Sailing the Seas of Cheese. The album was supported by the singles "Jerry Was a Race Car Driver" and "Tommy the Cat", both of which appeared on MTV. A third single, "Those Damned Blue-Collar Tweekers", was also released but did not feature a video. "Tommy the Cat" appeared on the soundtrack of Bill & Ted's Bogus Journey and the band made a cameo appearance in the film. Primus made a Beavis and Butt-Head tribute song entitled "Poetry and Prose" which appeared on the tie-in album The Beavis and Butt-Head Experience. With a major label behind them, Sailing the Seas of Cheese went gold. The band then toured in support of Rush, U2, Anthrax, Public Enemy, and Fishbone.

After the release of Sailing the Seas of Cheese, in 1992, Primus released a cover song EP Miscellaneous Debris, with their version of XTC's "Making Plans for Nigel" receiving enough airplay to reach No. 30 on Billboard's Modern Rock Tracks chart.

In 1993, Primus released Pork Soda, which managed to debut at No. 7 on the Billboard 200. The album was darker than previous Primus efforts, dealing with murder, suicide, and alienation. The band has commented that prior to recording, they had been touring for nearly two solid years and were thus in a sombre mood. "My Name Is Mud" was the first single, reaching No. 9 on the U.S. Alternative Songs chart.  "DMV" and "Mr. Krinkle" followed, the latter made into a video featuring Claypool in a pig suit and tuxedo playing upright bass in an abandoned warehouse as a carnival of oddities parades behind him, including Claypool's wife and her twin sister. Claypool said he put his "heart and soul" into the video, but it received next to no airtime on MTV. In an interview with Guitar World magazine, Claypool disparaged the channel's unwillingness to air the video, saying "it got played like six times."

Pork Soda was recorded at the band's rehearsal space in San Rafael. The band would subsequently record all of their albums at Claypool's home studio called Rancho Relaxo (a Simpsons TV show reference).

In 1993, Primus headlined the alternative rock festival Lollapalooza. They also made an appearance at the Woodstock '94 Music Festival. They were pelted with mud while they performed "My Name Is Mud". About a minute into the song the band stopped playing, and Claypool said, "Well I opened a big-ass can of worms with that one, didn't I? The song is called 'My Name Is Mud', but keep the mud to yourselves you son-of-a-bitch."

During a lull in 1994, the early Primus lineup of Claypool, Huth, and Lane reunited to record Riddles Are Abound Tonight under the band name Sausage, named after the demo they had recorded together in 1988. Among the songs they recorded is an early version of "The Toys Go Winding Down", retitled "Toyz 1988". The video for the title track "Riddles Are Abound Tonight" featured the band in blue leotards performing on stationary bicycles.

In 1995, Primus released their fourth album, Tales from the Punchbowl. It contained Primus's most successful single to date, which is the Grammy-nominated "Wynona's Big Brown Beaver". The song was accompanied by a video with the band members dressed up in cartoonish plastic cowboy costumes (similar to the suits worn in the then-current Duracell battery commercials). The band was invited to perform on the Late Show with David Letterman and Late Night with Conan O'Brien. On the David Letterman show, Primus appeared dressed in penguin tuxedos. Two other less successful singles, "Mrs. Blaileen" and "Southbound Pachyderm" (the latter of which featured a claymation video that received only minimal airplay on MTV) were also released.

In 1996, Claypool self-produced his first solo album entitled Les Claypool and the Holy Mackerel Presents Highball with the Devil. On this album many of the songs are done solely by Claypool himself. Claypool also employs the help of a number of other musicians. Experimental Bay Area guitarist M.I.R.V. joined Claypool and others. Performances include a spoken word piece from Henry Rollins on the song "Delicate Tendrils". This album was recorded at Rancho Relaxo.

Brown Album, Antipop, and hiatus (1997–2002)

Alexander left the band and was replaced by Brain of Limbomaniacs and Praxis. Claypool stated "Herb's departure was like a marriage that just slowly decayed to an end." With Mantia aboard, Primus were asked in 1996 to compose the theme song to South Park. Primus also later contributed to the Chef Aid album with the song "Mephisto and Kevin".

Brown Album was released in 1997 and supported by the singles "Shake Hands with Beef" and "Over the Falls". In 1998, the band headlined the inaugural Sno-Core tour with the Aquabats, Long Beach Dub Allstars and Blink-182.

In late 1998, Primus released the Rhinoplasty EP, which has covers of acts like XTC, the Police and Peter Gabriel. The EP also includes two live recordings of Primus, as well as bonus content accessed through a CD-ROM portion of the CD. It was shortly followed by the video release Videoplasty.

Antipop was released in 1999, and featured production and guest appearances from James Hetfield of Metallica, Tom Morello of Rage Against the Machine, Matt Stone, one of the creators of South Park, Stewart Copeland of The Police, Jim Martin of Faith No More, and Fred Durst of Limp Bizkit. While producing the song "Lacquer Head", Durst encouraged Primus to return to the more aggressive sound of their earlier albums for Antipop. Some critics compared the album's murky downtuned guitars to nu metal, which was popular during the time. The band toured in support of Antipop at Ozzfest and on the Family Values Tour. The band released a music video for the album's only single, "Lacquer Head", which was banned from MTV because of references to and depictions of drug use, despite the song's anti-drug message. Tensions among the band rose considerably during this period, Claypool stated "there was some doubt at the label as to whether we knew what the hell we were doing anymore."

In 2000, Primus performed a cover of Black Sabbaths song "N.I.B." featuring vocals by Ozzy Osbourne. The track originally appeared on the album Nativity in Black II: A Tribute to Black Sabbath. The track was also released as part of Osbourne's 2005 Prince of Darkness box set.

The band went on hiatus from 2000 to 2003, with Claypool later stating: "The end of the Nineties was an unhappy Primus camp. I hit a creative stagnation that wasn't helping us forward, and the personal elements, it just was time to stop. And I had been asked for many years, "How long can Primus go on?" And I always said, "I'll do it until it's not fun anymore." And it just wasn't fun anymore on many different levels."

During this hiatus, Alexander released two albums with the band Laundry and performed with Blue Man Group, A Perfect Circle, and Born Naked, among others. Claypool explored the jam band scene with Oysterhead (featuring friend Trey Anastasio of Phish and Stewart Copeland of the Police) and his own Colonel Les Claypool's Fearless Flying Frog Brigade (featuring both Huth and Lane). He also collaborated with Brain, Buckethead and Bernie Worrell in the group Colonel Claypool's Bucket of Bernie Brains.

Reformation (2003–2009)

In late 2003, Primus reunited with Alexander on drums to record a five track EP. Released alongside a DVD containing the band's music videos and clips from live performances, the resulting package was titled Animals Should Not Try to Act Like People. The band staged a two-month tour performing two sets per show, the second consisting of their 1991 release Sailing the Seas of Cheese in its entirety. 2004 saw them continue touring, this time performing their 1990 release Frizzle Fry in its entirety. For these two tours, the band sold recordings directly recorded from the sound-board online. The performance in Chicago was videotaped and released as a DVD titled Hallucino-Genetics: Live 2004.  They also performed a set at Bonnarroo in 2004, a late night set featuring a cover of "YYZ" by Rush and a guest appearance by Adrian Belew on "Thela Hun Ginjeet" a King Crimson cover.

In 2005, the band performed at Lollapalooza and Vegoose. Between Primus shows, Claypool created a new solo project called Les Claypool's Fancy Band which, like other projects, occasionally used Primus songs.

Primus performed on July 29, 2006, at the first annual Hedgpeth Festival in Twin Lakes, Wisconsin.

On October 17, 2006, Primus released both their first greatest hits CD They Can't All Be Zingers, as well as their third DVD Blame It on the Fish: an Abstract Look at the 2003 Primus Tour de Fromage. Containing live footage from the band's 2003 Tour de Fromage, interview segments and behind the scenes footage, the DVD includes a 70-minute feature film and 90 minutes of bonus material, including a 30-minute mockumentary about the band in the year 2065. Blame it on the Fish was directed by Matthew J. Powers. They Can't All Be Zingers: The Best of Primus includes 16 digitally remastered songs that span the band's career.

In November 2006, Primus commenced another tour  which concluded the following month. They played at a few festivals in 2008, including the Rothbury Festival (in Michigan), the Ottawa Blues Fest, the Quebec City Summer Festival, and the Outside Lands Festival (in San Francisco). On November 24, 2009, Prawn Song re-released the band's first studio album, Frizzle Fry, on vinyl record, along with some of Claypool's solo albums.

It was revealed in 2011 that Alexander lacked interest in continuing Primus, despite enthusiasm from LaLonde and Claypool. Claypool hinted that the band could have recorded with Alexander, but that "when we did readdress Primus in '03 and '06, it was more of a nostalgic thing. It was great at the time, but it just didn't have that creative spark as far as moving forward", and thus the reformation instead focused on touring.

Green Naugahyde (2010–2013)
On March 18, 2010, it was announced by Phil Lesh on his official message board that former Primus drummer Lane would be leaving his previous band Furthur to rejoin Primus. On May 3, 2010, Primus announced a new tour with Gogol Bordello, Wolfmother, and the Dead Kenny G's. The press release for the tour revealed that the band were looking to "refine their chops before heading into the studio to record their first album of brand new music since 1999's Antipop." Correlating with this announcement, the Primus website was updated with an animation of an elevator with its twelfth floor featuring a stylized question mark, and a sign reading "Primus will be with you shortly", alluding to future plans. In 2011, Claypool elaborated on the band's decision to record an album, stating that "(Lane) coming back has just breathed life back into the project. We did some touring, and we decided, "Let's go make a record," because we were creating things on the road."

On August 5, 2010, Primus released June 2010 Rehearsal, a free four-track rehearsal EP available for download on their official website. The EP consists of new recordings of previously released Primus songs featuring Lane on drums.

Primus began their second annual Oddity Faire tour on September 14, 2010, with opening acts Portugal. The Man, Split Lip Rayfield, Mariachi El Bronx, the New Orleans Bingo! Show, Mucca Pazza and Gogol Bordello.  The Squidling Brothers Circus Sideshow performers also entertained the crowd between bands on select dates. To promote this tour, Primus appeared on Jimmy Kimmel Live! in September. The Oddity Faire tour did not include dates in Primus's hometown, the San Francisco Bay Area, because for promotional purposes it was too near to the planned New Year's dates December 30 and 31 in Oakland.

Their song "Jerry Was a Race Car Driver" is included in the video game Rock Band 3, which was released on October 26, 2010.

In interviews conducted backstage at the Soundwave Festival in March 2011, Claypool said of the new Primus album "we've recorded it, we just need to polish it", and that the release date "should be around May or so". He also described the new material as being "very reminiscent of Frizzle Fry". In May, it was revealed that the album was complete and had been named Green Naugahyde, though the release date was pushed back to July to avoid the holidays. On June 6, a press release was issued announcing that the album would be released by ATO Records and Prawn Song on September 13, 2011. A second press release was later issued announcing that the album would be released in Europe on September 12. On August 17, the track "Tragedy's a' Comin'" was made available to stream via the Spin magazine website, followed by "HOINFODAMAN" on September 1 via the Rolling Stone site. On September 8, the TV show South Park made the entire album available for streaming to anybody who "likes" their Facebook page, including "Those Damned Blue-Collar Tweekers" as a bonus track.

Primus continued to tour throughout 2011, playing a number of dates in North America in May and June, including the Bonnaroo Music Festival, followed by a tour of Europe from late June to mid July. They then returned to America to play a few more music festivals leading into early August, including a show at the Red Rocks Amphitheatre in Denver, Colorado with the Flaming Lips, before embarking on a "major fall tour" in support of the new album.

In the fall of 2012, the band went on tour with the "first ever" 3D-enhanced live musical performance. Each show featured Quad Surround Sound and 3D visuals.

During March 2013, the band played for the very first time in Mexico City.

Electric Grapevine and the Chocolate Factory (2013–2017)
In September 2013, Claypool revealed that Lane had departed Primus to focus on RatDog with Bob Weir. Previous drummer Alexander rejoined the band in his place. Claypool also revealed that the band were "talking about going into the studio in November. But it's all a little premature - we'll see what happens". In December, Alexander revealed that the band had been "in Les's studio working on stuff for the new year's show but I don't know if there are any plans for releasing that." When asked about performing new material during the 2014 Australia tour, he said "looking at [the band's touring schedule], it doesn't look like there's going to be any time to write anything new."

The first official Primus show with Alexander back on drums was New Year's Eve 2013 at the Fox Theater in Oakland. The band performed their first set in front of the iconic Suck On This backdrop seen in the "Too Many Puppies" music video. For their second set, Primus were joined by "the Frog Brigade Ensemble", consisting of saxophonist Skerik and percussionist Mike Dillon, as they performed the soundtrack from the 1971 film Willy Wonka & the Chocolate Factory in its entirety. The band later announced that a studio recording of the soundtrack, titled Primus & the Chocolate Factory with the Fungi Ensemble, would be released on October 21, 2014.

On September 16, 2014, a biography of the band was released via Akashic Books titled Primus, Over the Electric Grapevine: Insight into Primus and the World of Les Claypool, written by music journalist and author Greg Prato in affiliation with Primus. The book chronicles the band's career alongside Claypool's other projects and features interviews with band members past and present, as well as Geddy Lee, Tom Waits, Tom Morello, Kirk Hammett, Stewart Copeland, Trey Anastasio, and Matt Stone, among others.

In late October 2015, the band released the first music video from their Primus & the Chocolate Factory with the Fungi Ensemble album, for the track "Candyman".

In mid-October 2016, the band performed at the fifth annual Desert Daze music festival in Joshua Tree, California.

The Desaturating Seven, "A Tribute To Kings" Tour, and Conspiranoid (2017–present)
On July 31, 2017, Primus announced their ninth studio album The Desaturating Seven and a US tour. On that same day, the album's first single "The Seven" was also released. The album is inspired by the children's book The Rainbow Goblins, written by Italian author Ul de Rico, which lead singer and bassist Claypool used to read to his children. It was released on September 29, 2017. During their co-headlining tour with Mastodon in 2018, the band played the album in its entirety. Primus – alongside Ministry and Philip H. Anselmo & The Illegals – also opened for Slayer on the final North American leg of their farewell tour in November 2019.

At the beginning of 2020, the band announced that they would be doing a tour in which every night they would cover Rush's 1977 album A Farewell to Kings in its entirety. The tour was postponed twice. Once due to the fact that Primus joined Slayer on their retirement tour and again due to the COVID-19 pandemic. In November 2020, they announced a livestream entitled "Alive From Pachyderm Station" that would air on December 11 at Primuslive.com if audience bought a ticket. The concert was filmed at Claypool's winery, "Claypool Cellars". The event marked the first time in 20 years that songs from Antipop were performed live, including the first official performance of the song (other than being played at soundcheck in Milwaukee in 1999) "Eclectic Electric". The "Tribute to Kings" tour commenced in August 2021 and originally wrapped up in October, followed by an encore extension beginning April 2022.

In an August 2021 interview with The Spokesman-Review, Claypool confirmed that a new Primus album is in the works: "Some ideas are being thrown around, but we're not there yet. We will have a new album at some point. We're focusing on this tour and Farewell to Kings. That's enough for us for now." In March 2022, Claypool revealed that the band was planning to release a new twelve-inch single featuring a 13-minute track called "Conspiranoia" and two songs as its b-sides. The Conspiranoid EP was released on April 22, 2022.

On August 9 and 10, 2022, Primus played the South Park 25th Anniversary Concert alongside Ween and South Park creators Matt Stone and Trey Parker. It was broadcast on Comedy Central on August 13 and on Paramount+ on August 14.

Musical style, legacy, and influences

Primus emerged from a metal background, with Les Claypool and Larry LaLonde previously having been part of the 1980s Californian thrash metal underground. Kirk Hammett, guitarist of Bay Area band Metallica, remarked in a 1991 interview that Primus are "unique, they're a square peg in a round hole". The music of Primus has been described as "thrash-funk meets Don Knotts, Jr." and "the Freak Brothers set to music". The Daily Freeman described the band's style as "a blend of funk metal and experimental rock". The AV Club described the band's music as "absurdist funk-rock". AllMusic places Primus within the first wave of alternative metal bands, saying that they fused heavy metal music with progressive rock. Entertainment Weekly classified the band's performance as "prog-rock self-indulgence". Stephen Thomas Erlewine suggests that Primus is "a post-punk Rush spiked with the sensibility and humor of Frank Zappa". Guitar Player said that Primus "plays rock the way Dr. Seuss intended. In their crazy backwards world, progressive metal beds down with art-funk, instrumental flash tangos cheek-to-cheek with self-mocking humor". Spin have labelled Primus as "pranksters" and, in 1995, as an "unlikely gold-selling white trash purveyor of hard-ass pinballing funk metal". 

Regarding the band's genre, Claypool stated in 1991, "We've been lumped in with the funk metal thing just about everywhere. I guess people just have to categorize you". Claypool dislikes the term "thrash-funk", saying that "it's more accurate than calling us a funk band, since I'm the only one in the group with any sort of funk background". Claypool himself once classified Primus's music as "psychedelic polka." Primus is the only band with its own ID3 genre tag, 'Primus', as introduced by Winamp. Primus's primary influence is the Residents, an avant-garde band that are well known for their anonymity and surreal music. Claypool has said he is often accused of being a member of the Residents due to their similar musical style. Other influences include King Crimson, Rush, Pink Floyd and Hillel Slovak-era Red Hot Chili Peppers.

The band have been credited as an influence to the nu metal genre, with bands such as  Deftones, Korn, Limp Bizkit, Pressure 4-5 and Pleymo all having been inspired by Primus. Limp Bizkit's frontman Fred Durst, who produced a song on the Primus album Antipop, stated in 1999 "I fucking love Primus. Spawned by pure rhythms, Primus has and always will be the most innovative and original source of groove to influence me in this decade. If you listen you will learn." Incubus vocalist Brandon Boyd has mentioned them as an influence, and said, "Primus was one of those bands that myself, José from our band, Mikey from our band, the three of us fully bonded over them. We would just crank their music in the car, outdoors."

Band members

Les Claypool – lead vocals, bass, double bass (1984–2000, 2003–present)
Larry "Ler" LaLonde – guitars, backing vocals (1989–2000, 2003–present)
Tim "Herb" Alexander – drums, backing vocals (1989–1996, 2003–2008, 2013-present)

Former members
Todd Huth – guitars, backing vocals (1984–1989)
Vince "Perm" Parker – drums (1984)
Peter Libby – drums (1984–1987)
Robbie Bean – drums (1987–1988)
Tim "Curveball" Wright – drums (1988)
Jay Lane – drums, backing vocals (1988–1989, 2010–2013)
Brain – drums (1989, 1996–2000)

Former touring members
Buckethead – guitars (1999)
Danny Carey – drums (2014)
DJ Disk – turntables (1998-1999)

Timeline

Discography

Frizzle Fry (1990)
Sailing the Seas of Cheese (1991)
Pork Soda (1993)
Tales from the Punchbowl (1995)
Brown Album (1997)
Antipop (1999)
Green Naugahyde (2011)
Primus & the Chocolate Factory with the Fungi Ensemble (2014)
The Desaturating Seven (2017)

Tours

 Bring the Noise Tour (1991)
 Roll the Bones Tour (1992)
 Zoo TV Tour (1992)
 Lollapalooza (1993)
 Liquid Pig Tour (1993)
 Counterparts Tour (1994)
 Punchbowl Tour (1995)
 Southbound Pachyderm Tour (1996)
 Brown Tour (1997)
 H.O.R.D.E. Tour (1997)
 SnoCore Tour (1998)
 Ozzfest (1999)
 Family Values Tour (1999)
 Antipop Tour (1999–2000)
 Tour de Fromage (2003–2004)
 Hallucino-Genetics Tour (2004)
 The Beat a Dead Horse Tour (2006)
 Summer Tour (2010)
 The Oddity Faire Tour (2010)
 Primus World Tour (2011)
 Guinea Pig Tour (2011)
 Green Naugahyde Tour (2011)

 Spring Tour (2012)
 Summer Camp Music Festival (2012)
 3D Tour (2012)
 3D Tour 2013 (2013)
 Spring Tour 2014 (2014)
 Primus and the Chocolate Factory (2014)
 Primus and the Chocolate Factory (2015)
 Primus & Tool Tour (2016)
 An Evening with Primus and Clutch (2017)
 Ambushing the Storm Tour (2017)
 Primus and Mastodon Summer Tour (2018)
 US Fall Tour (2018)
 Slayer's The Final Campaign Tour (2019)
 A Tribute To Kings Tour (Originally 2020) (2021-2022) (Dates are subject to change due to COVID-19)

Awards

See also
 List of bands from the San Francisco Bay Area
 List of alternative metal artists
 List of funk metal and funk rock bands
 List of progressive rock artists

References

External links

 Primus official website
 
 Primus FAQ
 
 "No Respect, Goddamnit!: On the trail of Primus", by Michael Goldberg for Addicted to Noise, May 1995. Archived from the original.
 Primus and Side Project Live Performances

 
American alternative metal musical groups
American comedy musical groups
American experimental rock groups
American funk metal musical groups
American musical trios
Alternative rock groups from California
Funk rock musical groups
Les Claypool
Musical groups established in 1984
Musical groups from San Francisco
Progressive rock musical groups from California
Interscope Records artists
Caroline Records artists
ATO Records artists